Twifo is one of the states established by the Akan when they first settled in the Adansi forest. Later the Akan kept migrating southward toward the coast, where they took over considerable area. By the beginning of the 16th century, European sources noted the state of Twifo, said to be rich in gold; they described it as near the forest area with a capital known as Hemang. These Akan brought their gold to the coastal area to sell and were known by the Europeans by variant names because they brought the finest gold. The people also became known as Twifo.

Overview
Duarte Pacheco Pereira, the earliest authority writing in 1505 about the Akan, referred to them by the name Quaforo, Cuffrue or Juffer, his attempt in Portuguese to render the sound of Twifo. The European traders noted that the Twifo as skillful traders. These Akan were a minority group. Their ancestors moved out of the Adansi area earlier than most of the Akan groups; they migrated toward the southern part of the Ashantiland Peninsula and settled in the forest area towards the coast. They established themselves socially, economically, militarily and politically. 

The Twifo kingdom with its ancient capital of Hemang welcomed other Akan groups into their area. They did not seek to consolidate power like many of the Akan states, and gave autonomy to the newcomers. Many settlers from various Akan groupings came later and settled on either side of the Pra River; all adopted the name Twifo.

Twifo groupings
In the 21st century, Four groupings are called Twifo: Hemang, Mampong, Tufoe and Morkwa.

Morkwa
The Morkwa, headed by their leader Nana Amo Kwaw, settled beyond the Pra River; they shared a common boundary with the already-settled Twifo Hemang kingdom. They adopted the name Twifo. The Morkwa territory was settled earlier than many sites beyond the Pra River.

Mampong,Tufoe and Hemang
The Mampong, headed by their leader Nana Ampontenfi, came later from Asante Nkawie. They settled first at Jukwa and built houses there. After some time, they applied for land at Twifo Hemang through the mediation of Tiboe of Jukwa Dankyira. They became paying guests around 1831 and also adopted the name Twifo after their settlement. They lived and paid fees annually to Twifo Hemang Kingdom for the land they occupied.

References

Akan
History of Ghana